The 1993 Save Mart Supermarkets 300K was the tenth stock car race of the 1993 NASCAR Winston Cup Series season, the fourth race of the 1993 NASCAR Winston West Series season, and the fifth iteration of the event. The race was held on Sunday, May 16, 1993, at the Grand Prix layout of Sears Point Raceway, a  permanent road course layout. The race took the scheduled 74 laps to complete. In the final laps of the race, Bud Moore Engineering driver Geoff Bodine would manage to fend off numerous challenges for the lead from Morgan–McClure Motorsports driver Ernie Irvan and Hendrick Motorsports driver Ricky Rudd to take his 15th career NASCAR Winston Cup Series victory and his only victory of the season. To fill out the top three, the aforementioned Irvan and Rudd would finish second and third, respectively.

Background 

Sears Point Raceway is one of two road courses to hold NASCAR races, the other being Watkins Glen International. The Chute was only used for NASCAR events such as this race, and was criticized by many drivers, who preferred the full layout.

Entry list 

 (R) denotes rookie driver.

Qualifying 
Qualifying was split into two rounds. The first round was held on Friday, May 14, at 6:30 PM EST. Each driver would have one lap to set a time. During the first round, the top 25 drivers in the round would be guaranteed a starting spot in the race. If a driver was not able to guarantee a spot in the first round, they had the option to scrub their time from the first round and try and run a faster lap time in a second round qualifying run, held on Saturday, May 15, at 1:00 PM EST. As with the first round, each driver would have one lap to set a time. For this specific race, positions 26-40 would be decided on time, and depending on who needed it, a select amount of positions were given to cars who had not otherwise qualified but were high enough in owner's points; which was one for cars in the NASCAR Winston Cup Series and two extra provisionals for the NASCAR Winston West Series. If needed, a past champion who did not qualify on either time or provisionals could use a champion's provisional, adding one more spot to the field.

Five drivers would fail to qualify.

Full qualifying results

Race results

Standings after the race 

Drivers' Championship standings

Note: Only the first 10 positions are included for the driver standings.

References 

1993 NASCAR Winston Cup Series
NASCAR races at Sonoma Raceway
May 1993 sports events in the United States
1993 in sports in California